Garden City Radio 89.9 is a state owned commercial FM radio station in Port Harcourt, Nigeria, which broadcasts across Rivers State from studios in Old GRA. The station's signal strength reaches about four surrounding states including Abia, Akwa Ibom, Bayelsa and Imo. Its target audience are people from ages 25–54.

Garden City Radio airs an urban adult contemporary format and is one of the high-ranking stations in Port Harcourt. The station originally launched its digital services on 96.2 in June 2011, followed by a 1 October rebranding move. By December 2011, Garden City's frequency became 89.9 following instructions from the National Broadcasting Commission (NBC).

See also

List of radio stations in Port Harcourt

References

External links

Garden City 89.9 website 

Radio stations established in 2011
Radio stations in Port Harcourt
Government-owned companies of Nigeria
Companies based in Port Harcourt
Urban adult contemporary radio stations
Old GRA, Port Harcourt
2011 establishments in Nigeria
2010s establishments in Rivers State